Norman or Norm Jones may refer to:

Politicians
Norman Jones (politician) (1923–1987), New Zealand legislator
Norman L. Jones (1870–1940), American jurist and politician
Gerry Jones (Norman Francis Jones, 1932–2017), Australian political organiser and legislator

Other people
Norman Sherwood-Jones (1911–1951), English Anglican bishop in Nigeria
Norman Jones (actor) (1932–2013), English actor
Norman Jones (boxer) (1930–1999), Australian Olympic boxer
Norman Jones (footballer), English footballer of the 1920s
Norman Jones (sailor) (1923–1995), Canadian-Bermudian sailor
Norman Cyril Jones (1895–1974), English flying ace during World War I
Norm Jones, civil engineering professor and co-founder of Aquaveo

See also
Noko (Norman Fisher-Jones, born 1962), English multi-instrumentalist musician, composer and producer
Jones (surname)